Francesco Cetti (9 August 1726 – 20 November 1778) was an Italian Jesuit priest, zoologist and mathematician.

Cetti was born in Mannheim in Germany, but his parents were natives of Como. He was educated in Lombardy and at the Jesuit college at Monza. In 1765 he was sent to Sardinia to help improve the standard of education on the island. In 1766 he was appointed to the Chair of Mathematics at the University of Sassari, holding that position until his death.

Cetti took long excursions in the vicinity of Sassari, collating his discoveries in the Storia Naturale di Sardegna (Natural History of Sardinia) (1774–7). This has four volumes, covering quadrupeds, birds, fish, and insects and fossils respectively.

Cetti is commemorated in the name of the Cetti's warbler (Cettia cetti), which was collected on Sardinia by Alberto della Marmora.

References
Biographies for Birdwatchers – Barbara and Richard Mearns

External links
Zoologica Göttingen State and University Library

1726 births
1778 deaths
Clergy from Mannheim
18th-century Italian Jesuits
Italian ornithologists
Italian zoologists
18th-century Italian mathematicians
Jesuit scientists
Scientists from Lombardy